Casper Kruse House, also known as the Wilhelmina Stumpe House, is a historic home located at Washington, Franklin County, Missouri. It was built about 1868, and is a -story, three bay, side entry brick dwelling on a stone foundation.  It has a side-gable roof and low segmental arched door and window openings.  Also on the property is a contributing two-story brick smokehouse.

It was listed on the National Register of Historic Places in 2000.

References

Houses on the National Register of Historic Places in Missouri
Houses completed in 1868
Buildings and structures in Franklin County, Missouri
National Register of Historic Places in Franklin County, Missouri
1868 establishments in Missouri